The Pekin Tapes is the sixth studio album by American progressive rock/AOR band Pavlov's Dog, released in 2014.

The album was recorded in October 1973 in just three days and produced by the band themselves, with the intention of earning them a contract with a record label to release it as their debut. Impressed by the album's quality, ABC Records signed Pavlov's Dog on a $650,000 deal, but the company decided they needed to refine the material before releasing it. Under the guidance of Sandy Pearlman and Murray Krugman, five of The Pekin Tapess songs were re-recorded, and with the addition of four new compositions they became the band's debut album Pampered Menial in early 1975.

The original recordings remained unreleased and were thought destroyed in 1977 when Golden Voice Studios burned down, but in 2014 a well-preserved copy was discovered in a private collection. Rockville Music restored the tape the best they could and released the album in November 2014. The album's bonus tracks are demos recorded in March 1973, and they are the earliest known Pavlov's Dog recordings.

Track listing
All information according to the album's liner notes.
Tracks in bold were re-recorded for Pavlov's Dog debut album Pampered Menial.

Personnel
All information according to the album's liner notes

Pavlov's Dog
David Surkamp – vocals, guitar
Steve Scorfina – lead guitar, vocals
David Hamilton – keyboards, vocals
Doug Rayburn – keyboards, mellotron
Sigfried Carver – violin
Rick Stockton – bass guitar, backing vocals
Mike Safron – drums, backing vocals

Production
Pavlov's Dog – production of the original recording
Christoph Stickel – mastering and restoration
Manfred Ploetz – mastering and restoration

Artwork
Hannah Detring
Gregory Davis
Jonathan Pelhank

References

2014 albums
Pavlov's Dog (band) albums